Otis Henry Thorpe (born August 5, 1962) is an American former professional basketball player who played for several teams in the National Basketball Association (NBA). He was an NBA All-Star in 1992 and won an NBA championship with the Houston Rockets in 1994.

Early years
Thorpe graduated in 1980 from Lake Worth Community High School in Florida. He played college ball at Providence College. He had the longest NBA career of any former Friars player. He ranks seventh all-time at the school in rebounds and was the school's first First-Team Big East player. During his tenure at Providence College he was also a two-time Honorable Mention All-America selection.

NBA career

Kansas City/Sacramento Kings 
Thorpe was drafted by the Kansas City Kings as the ninth overall pick in the first round of the 1984 NBA draft. In 1985, the Kings relocated to Sacramento. During the 1987-88 NBA season, Thorpe averaged career-highs of 20.8 points, 10.2 rebounds, and 3.2 assists. That year, in perhaps his best game of the season, Thorpe nearly missed a triple-double with 35 points, 11 rebounds, and 9 assists. Thorpe was traded to the Houston Rockets for Rodney McCray and Jim Petersen in 1989.

Houston Rockets 
While with the Rockets, Thorpe made an All-Star appearance in 1992. Thorpe played in 542 consecutive games between 1986 and 1992 and, at one time, held the longest streak of consecutive games played in the NBA.

On December 7, 1993, Thorpe scored a career-high 40 points in a win over the Charlotte Hornets. That season, Thorpe was an integral part of the Houston Rockets' trip to the 1994 NBA Finals and subsequent first NBA Championship.

Halfway through the next season, the Rockets realized that they were struggling and needed a change. The team sent Thorpe to the Portland Trail Blazers in a deal for Clyde Drexler and Tracy Murray. He holds the Rockets' all-time record for the highest field goal accuracy (55.9%).

Portland Trail Blazers 
Thorpe would only play 34 games for the Blazers before moving on to occupy the starting front court for the Detroit Pistons (who acquired him in a package for Randolph Childress and Bill Curley) for the next two years.

Vancouver Grizzlies 
Before the start of the 1997–98 season, the Pistons dealt Thorpe to the Vancouver Grizzlies for a conditional first-round draft pick which eventually conveyed to the Pistons as the second pick in the 2003 draft, Darko Miličić.

Thorpe would play 47 games with the Grizzlies before returning to the Kings in a trade that sent Bobby Hurley and Michael Smith to Vancouver. (Chris Robinson was also traded to the Kings as part of the deal.)

Bouncing around the league and career endings 
In the offseason, he was traded (along with Mitch Richmond) to the Washington Wizards for Chris Webber. He signed with the Miami Heat in 1999 and was traded to the Charlotte Hornets, along with Rodney Buford, P.J. Brown, Jamal Mashburn, and Tim James in a deal for Anthony Mason, Ricky Davis, Dale Ellis, and Eddie Jones. When Thorpe finished his last game in 2001, he was the last remaining member of the Kansas City Kings to retire.

Thorpe holds career averages of 14.0 points and 8.2 rebounds per game. He finished his career with over 17,000 points and 10,000 rebounds in the NBA.

NBA career statistics

Regular season 

|-
| style="text-align:left;"| 
| style="text-align:left;"| Kansas City
| 82 || 23 || 23.4 || .600 || .000 || .620 || 6.8 || 1.4 || .4 || .5 || 12.8
|-
| style="text-align:left;"| 
| style="text-align:left;"| Sacramento
| 75 || 18 || 22.3 || .587 || - || .661 || 5.6 || 1.1 || .5 || .5 || 9.9
|-
| style="text-align:left;"| 
| style="text-align:left;"| Sacramento
| 82 || 82 || 36.0 || .540 || .000 || .761 || 10.0 || 2.5 || .6 || .7 || 18.9
|-
| style="text-align:left;"| 
| style="text-align:left;"| Sacramento
| 82 || 82 || 37.5 || .507 || .000 || .755 || 10.2 || 3.2 || .8 || .7 || 20.8
|-
| style="text-align:left;"| 
| style="text-align:left;"| Houston
| 82 || 82 || 38.2 || .542 || .000 || .729 || 9.6 || 2.5 || 1.0 || .5 || 16.7
|-
| style="text-align:left;"| 
| style="text-align:left;"| Houston
| 82 || 82 || 35.9 || .548 || .000 || .688 || 9.0 || 3.2 || .8 || .3 || 17.1
|-
| style="text-align:left;"| 
| style="text-align:left;"| Houston
| 82 || 82 || 37.1 || .556 || .429 || .696 || 10.3 || 2.4 || .9 || .2 || 17.5
|-
| style="text-align:left;"| 
| style="text-align:left;"| Houston
| 82 || 82 || 37.3 || .592 || .000 || .657 || 10.5 || 3.0 || .6 || .5 || 17.3
|-
| style="text-align:left;"| 
| style="text-align:left;"| Houston
| 72 || 69 || 32.7 || .558 || .000 || .598 || 8.2 || 2.5 || .6 || .3 || 12.8
|-
| style="text-align:left;" bgcolor="AFE6BA"| †
| style="text-align:left;"| Houston
| 82 || 82 || 35.5 || .561 || .000 || .657 || 10.6 || 2.3 || .8 || .3 || 14.0
|-
| style="text-align:left;"| 
| style="text-align:left;"| Houston
| 36 || 35 || 33.0 || .563 || .000 || .528 || 8.9 || 1.6 || .6 || .4 || 13.3
|-
| style="text-align:left;"| 
| style="text-align:left;"| Portland
| 34 || 0 || 26.7 || .568 || .000 || .649 || 6.9 || 1.6 || .6 || .4 || 13.5
|-
| style="text-align:left;"| 
| style="text-align:left;"| Detroit
| 82 || 82 || 34.6 || .530 || .000 || .710 || 8.4 || 1.9 || .6 || .5 || 14.2
|-
| style="text-align:left;"| 
| style="text-align:left;"| Detroit
| 79 || 79 || 33.7 || .532 || .000 || .653 || 7.9 || 1.7 || .7 || .2 || 13.1
|-
| style="text-align:left;"| 
| style="text-align:left;"| Vancouver
| 47 || 46 || 33.5 || .477 || .000 || .694 || 7.9 || 3.4 || .6 || .5 || 11.2
|-
| style="text-align:left;"| 
| style="text-align:left;"| Sacramento
| 27 || 20 || 23.1 || .459 || .000 || .657 || 6.1 || 2.3 || .7 || .3 || 8.3
|-
| style="text-align:left;"| 
| style="text-align:left;"| Washington
| 49 || 38 || 31.4 || .545 || .000 || .698 || 6.8 || 2.1 || .9 || .4 || 11.3
|-
| style="text-align:left;"| 
| style="text-align:left;"| Miami
| 51 || 1 || 15.2 || .514 || .000 || .604 || 3.3 || .6 || .5 || .2 || 5.5
|-
| style="text-align:left;"| 
| style="text-align:left;"| Charlotte
| 49 || 4 || 13.2 || .450 || - || .833 || 3.0 || .6 || .2 || .1 || 2.8
|- class="sortbottom"
| style="text-align:center;" colspan=2| Career
| 1,257 || 989 || 31.7 || .546 || .047 || .687 || 8.2 || 2.2 || .7 || .4 || 14.0
|- class="sortbottom"
| style="text-align:center;" colspan=2| All-Star
| 1 || 0 || 4.0 || 1.000 || - || - || - || - || - || - || 2.0

Playoffs 

|-
| style="text-align:left;"| 1986
| style="text-align:left;"| Sacramento
| 3 || 0 || 11.7 || .231 || - || .462 || 4.0 || .0 || .0 || .3 || 4.0
|-
| style="text-align:left;"| 1989
| style="text-align:left;"| Houston
| 4 || 4 || 38.0 || .649 || - || .762 || 5.0 || 3.0 || 1.3 || .3 || 16.0
|-
| style="text-align:left;"| 1990
| style="text-align:left;"| Houston
| 4 || 4 || 41.0 || .600 || - || .684 || 8.3 || 1.8 || 1.3 || .0 || 20.0
|-
| style="text-align:left;"| 1991
| style="text-align:left;"| Houston
| 3 || 3 || 38.7 || .579 || - || .500 || 8.3 || 2.7 || .7 || .0  || 15.7
|-
| style="text-align:left;"| 1993
| style="text-align:left;"| Houston
| 12 || 12 || 34.9 || .635 || - || .651 || 8.6 || 2.6 || .5 || .1 || 14.5
|-
| style="text-align:left;" bgcolor="AFE6BA"| 1994†
| style="text-align:left;"| Houston
| 23 || 23 || 37.1 || .572 || .500 || .567 || 9.9 || 2.3 || .6 || .4 || 11.3
|-
| style="text-align:left;"| 1995
| style="text-align:left;"| Portland
| 3 || 0 || 22.0 || .571 || - || .700 || 4.3 || .7 || .0 || .0 || 10.3
|-
| style="text-align:left;"| 1996
| style="text-align:left;"| Detroit
| 3 || 3 || 33.7 || .542 || - || .750 || 11.7 || 2.3 || .0 || .0 || 11.7
|-
| style="text-align:left;"| 1997
| style="text-align:left;"| Detroit
| 5 || 5 || 30.4 || .512 || - || .778 || 6.4 || .8 || .4 || .0 || 9.8
|-
| style="text-align:left;"| 2000
| style="text-align:left;"| Miami
| 10 || 0 || 13.6 || .481 || .000 || .500 || 2.9 || .3 || .0 || .2 || 3.3
|-
| style="text-align:left;"| 2001
| style="text-align:left;"| Charlotte
| 8 || 0 || 7.1 || .222 || - || - || 2.1 || .0 || .0 || .0 || .5
|-class="sortbottom"
| style="text-align:center;" colspan=2| Career
| 78 || 54 || 28.9 || .569 || .333 || .631 || 7.0 || 1.6 || .4 || .2 || 10.1

See also
 List of National Basketball Association career games played leaders
 List of National Basketball Association career rebounding leaders
 List of National Basketball Association career turnovers leaders
 List of National Basketball Association career minutes played leaders

References

External links
 Providence Friars bio
 NBA bio

1962 births
Living people
21st-century African-American people
African-American basketball players
American expatriate basketball people in Canada
American men's basketball players
Basketball players from Florida
Centers (basketball)
Charlotte Hornets players
Detroit Pistons players
Houston Rockets players
Kansas City Kings draft picks
Kansas City Kings players
Miami Heat players
National Basketball Association All-Stars
Portland Trail Blazers players
Power forwards (basketball)
Providence Friars men's basketball players
Sacramento Kings players
Sportspeople from Boynton Beach, Florida
Vancouver Grizzlies players
20th-century African-American sportspeople